Beverly Salviejo (born 18 October 1956) is a Filipino actor, and singer.

Career

Career beginnings 

Salviejo started out as a classical singer and stage actress. She rose to fame in the mid-’80s playing the loyal housekeeper in the hit sitcom Urbana at Feliza.

Filmography

Television

Film

Awards and nominations

References

External links
 

Living people
Place of birth missing (living people)
20th-century Filipino women singers
Filipino film actresses
Filipino television actresses
Filipino stage actresses
2001 births